The 76 mm mountain gun M-48 (AKA the Tito Gun), was developed after the Second World War to meet the requirements of Yugoslav People's Army mountain units, it can also be used as a field gun.

Description
The first M-48B-1 models may have been Czech M28 mountain guns (bought by Yugoslavia in 1930s) relined from original 75mm calibre to Soviet 76mm (as used on their 76mm regimental and divisional guns), with muzzle-brake added to cope with increased recoil (also Skoda type, borrowed from M.36 AA model).

There have been at least five variants of the M48:
 The M-48 (B-1) has pneumatic tyres and a maximum towing speed of 60 km/h. It can also be towed by animals in tandem or disassembled into eight pack loads.
 The M-48 (B-1A1-I) has the pneumatic tyres and wheels as fitted to the M48 (B-1), plus some of the features of the suspension of the M48 (B-1A2).
 The M-48 (B-1A2) can also be used as a field piece but cannot be towed by animals or disassembled for pack transport.
 The M-48 (B-1A2) has light alloy wheels with solid rubber tyres and modified suspension, its maximum towing speed is 30 km/h.
 The final production model of the 76 mm mountain gun M48 was called the B-2 about which little is known.

The  was a Romanian built version which equipped mountain, paratroop and naval infantry.

Ammunition
Ammunition is of the semi-fixed type with four charges. It is based on that used for the Soviet ZiS-3 (and older) divisional guns (which fired fixed ammunition), but with reduced propelling charge:

 HE M55 projectile weighing 6.2 kg with a muzzle velocity between 222 and 398 m/s;
 High-explosive anti-tank (HEAT) projectile weighing 5.1 kg which will penetrate 100 mm of conventional steel armour at a range of 450 m; and
 Smoke shell WP M60 weighing 6,2 kg.
 HE M70 projectile weighing 6.2 kg with a muzzle velocity up to 398 m/s;

Users

  10
  212
  95 in service
  215
  40
  n/a
  30 in reserve
  97
  n/a
  14

Photo Gallery

Notes

References
 Chamberlain, Peter & Gander, Terry. Infantry, Mountain and Airborne Guns. New York: Arco, 1975
 Jane's All the Worlds Artillery

External links
 Article at Jane's

Mountain artillery
Artillery of Yugoslavia
Weapons and ammunition introduced in 1948